Acleris cristana, the rufous-margined button moth, is a moth of the family Tortricidae and is found from Europe through the Caucasus and Ussuri to Japan.

The wingspan is 18–22 mm. Adults are on wing from August to November and again from March to May after hibernation. It shows a wide variation in appearance and has 137 named forms as well as numerous synonyms. Forms look different but are the same species and can breed together.
Julius von Kennel provides a full description. 

The larvae feed between spun leaves on various rosaceous trees and bushes, including Prunus spinosa and Crataegus species (e.g. Crataegus maximowiczi). Other recorded food plants include Carpinus betulus, Ulmus campestris, Rosa, Malus species (including Malus pumila), Salix caprea, Sorbus sambucifolia, Cerasus sachalinensis, Prunus salicina and Zelkova serrata.

References

External links
 UKmoths

cristana
Moths of Asia
Tortricidae of Europe
Moths described in 1775
Taxa named by Michael Denis
Taxa named by Ignaz Schiffermüller